Grabe pri Ljutomeru is a settlement on the left bank of the Ščavnica River in the Municipality of Križevci in northeastern Slovenia. The area is part of the traditional region of Styria. It is now included with the rest of the municipality in the Mura Statistical Region.

Name
The name of the settlement was changed from Grabe to Grabe pri Ljutomeru in 1953.

Cultural heritage
The village chapel was built in the Neo-Gothic style in the last quarter of the 19th century.

References

External links
Grabe pri Ljutomeru on Geopedia

Populated places in the Municipality of Križevci